How Deep Is Your Hood is the second and last album of the American gangsta rap group Damu Ridas. It was released on November 10, 1999. Rappers included Big Wy and Dogg as well as B-Brazy, Lil' Hawk and several other Bloods and Pirus.

Track listing 

1999 albums
Damu Ridas albums